Changde railway station is a railway station in Wuling District, Changde, Hunan, China on the Shimen–Changsha railway, Qianjiang–Changde railway, and Changde–Yiyang–Changsha high-speed railway. It was built in 1997.

History
On 26 December 2022, Changyichang high-speed railway was extended here.

References 

Railway stations in Hunan
Railway stations in China opened in 1997